Fitzgerald High School may refer to:
Fitzgerald High School (Georgia) - Fitzgerald, Georgia
Fitzgerald High School (Michigan) - Warren, Michigan, in Metro Detroit